Cambridge University Footlights Dramatic Club, commonly referred to simply as the Footlights, is an amateur theatrical club in Cambridge, England, founded in 1883 and run by the students of Cambridge University.

History
Footlights' inaugural performance took place in June 1883. For some months before the name "Footlights" was chosen, the group had performed to local audiences in the Cambridge area (once, with a cricket match included, at the "pauper lunatic asylum"). They wished to go wider than the University Amateur Dramatic Club (ADC), founded in 1855, with its membership drawn largely from Trinity College, and its theatre seating only 100. They were to perform every May Week at the Theatre Royal, Barnwell, Cambridge, the shows soon open to the public. A local paper commended the club's appeal to the "general public, the many different classes of which life in Cambridge is made up".

The club grew in prominence in the 1960s as a hotbed of comedy and satire, and established a permanent home in the basement of the Cambridge Union. Having established a tradition of performing at the annual Edinburgh Festival Fringe, the club entered the mainstream when its members formed half of Beyond the Fringe, the hugely popular stage revue which toured Britain and America in 1960. The 1963 revue then followed in the footsteps of Beyond the Fringe, appearing in Edinburgh and London's West End, before travelling to New Zealand and the United States, where it made appearances on Broadway and The Ed Sullivan Show and received a full-page review in Time.

The first woman to be given full membership was Germaine Greer. She joined in October 1964 on the same day as Clive James and Russell Davies. There had been women before that time who had been allowed to join in, including Eleanor Bron in the late 1950s, but Greer was the first to be billed as a full member. Apparently Tim Brooke-Taylor was instrumental in having women admitted. She was part of the Footlights' 1965 revue My Girl Herbert.

Over the next decade, Footlights members came to dominate British comedy in the 1970s, creating and starring in shows such as Not Only... But Also, I'm Sorry, I'll Read That Again, At Last the 1948 Show, That Was the Week That Was and The Hitchhiker's Guide To The Galaxy, forming comedy groups such as Monty Python and The Goodies, and generally fuelling the satire boom. During the 1980s, Footlights reinforced its position at the heart of British comedy. The 1981 revue, featuring Emma Thompson, Hugh Laurie, Stephen Fry, Tony Slattery, Penny Dwyer and Paul Shearer, won the inaugural Perrier Award at the Edinburgh Fringe Festival and spawned Fry and Laurie, the first in a long line of popular and successful double acts formed at the club including Armstrong and Miller and Mitchell and Webb. Their revue, The Cellar Tapes, at St Mary Street Hall was billed as "the annual revue: one of the strongest casts for several years, has already toured in southern England with great success."

Former members have gone on to win Oscars, BAFTAs and other awards and enjoy success in the entertainment industry.

Activities
During term, Footlights produce the regular "Smokers"—an informal mixture of sketches and stand-up—at the ADC Theatre. The club also produces the annual Pantomime (in collaboration with CUADC) and the Spring Revue, as well as staging the winning entry of the Footlights Harry Porter Prize; a competition in which any student at the university may enter a one-hour comic play. The Footlights International Tour Show takes place from June until October, and travels to Cambridge, London, Edinburgh and venues across the USA. For information about individual Footlights revues, see Cambridge Footlights Revue.

Former members

This is a list of former members of Footlights who achieved notability after graduating from Cambridge University.

Presidents
The elected leader of Cambridge University Footlights Dramatic Club is known as the president, who is assisted by a vice-president, treasurer, archivist and several other posts to form the committee.

Notable past presidents have included the following:
 Peter Cook (of Beyond the Fringe, Pete and Dud and Not Only... But Also)
 Tim Brooke-Taylor (of  The Goodies, I'm Sorry, I'll Read That Again and I'm Sorry I Haven't a Clue)
 Graeme Garden (of  The Goodies, I'm Sorry, I'll Read That Again and I'm Sorry I Haven't a Clue)
 Eric Idle (of Monty Python)
 Clive James (author of Cultural Amnesia and Unreliable Memoirs)
 Clive Anderson (of Whose Line Is It Anyway?)
 Jan Ravens (of Dead Ringers), the first woman president
 Hugh Laurie (of Fry and Laurie, Jeeves and Wooster and House)
 Douglas Adams (author of The Hitchhiker's Guide To The Galaxy)
 Tony Slattery (of Whose Line Is It Anyway?)
 Neil Mullarkey (of Austin Powers)
 Sue Perkins (of The Great British Bake Off and Mel and Sue)
 David Mitchell (of That Mitchell and Webb Look and Peep Show)
 Robert Thorogood (creator of BBC1's Death in Paradise)
 Richard Ayoade (of Garth Marenghi's Darkplace and The IT Crowd)
 Simon Bird (of The Inbetweeners and Friday Night Dinner)

See also
 Cambridge University Light Entertainment Society
 The Oxford Revue

References

External links
 Official website
 Official International Tour website
 Past members and shows
 Footlights Alumni Association
 The Cambridge Footlights Review, 1982

1883 establishments in England
Amateur theatre companies in England
Clubs and societies of the University of Cambridge
Culture of the University of Cambridge
Lists of people associated with the University of Cambridge
Organizations established in 1883
Student theatre in the United Kingdom
Student comedy troupes
Theatre in Cambridge